David Stephens (born 1989) is a British footballer who plays for Barnet as a defender.

David Stephens may also refer to:
 David Stephens (parliamentary official) (1910–1990), British public servant
 David Stephens (Wisconsin politician) (1837–1910), American politician and building contractor in Wisconsin
 David Stephens (rugby) rugby union and rugby league footballer of the 1960s and 1970s
 Dave Stephens (javelin thrower) (born 1962), American former javelin thrower
 Dave Stephens (runner) (born 1928), Australian former long-distance runner

See also 
 David Stevens (disambiguation)